The version history of the HarmonyOS distributed operating system began with the public release of the HarmonyOS 1.0 for Honor Vision smart TVs on August 9, 2019. The first commercial version of the operating system, HarmonyOS 2.0, was released on June 2, 2021 for phones, tablets, smartwatches, smart speakers, routers, and internet of things. Beforehand, DevEco Studio, the HarmonyOS app development IDE, hat been released in September 2020 together with the HarmonyOS 2.0 Beta. HarmonyOS is developed by Huawei. New major releases are announced at the Huawei Developers Conference (HDC) in the fourth quarter of each year together with the first public beta version of the operating system's next major version. The next major stable version is then released in the third quarter of the following year.

Overview 
The first public release of HarmonyOS 1.0 occurred with the release of Huawei's former brand Honor Vision smart TVs on August 15, 2019, after it was announced on August 10, 2019, as the first HarmonyOS powered commercial product in Huawei's domestic market, China.

HarmonyOS 2.0 was released on June 2, 2021, commercially in Huawei's domestic Chinese market, as de facto Beta testers for Chinese users, and was quickly adopted by 10 million users within a week. It was gradually rolled out globally to tablets, smartwatches and bands in Huawei's product lines between the second half of 2021 and the first half of 2022.

The current release HarmonyOS 3.0 with API 8 and an enhanced feature set was rolled out on July 27, 2022.

Version history 
The following tables show the release dates and key features of all HarmonyOS operating system updates to date, listed chronologically by their official application programming interface (API) versions.

Pre-release (Internal) 

 Harmony kernel 1.0 - Technology verified (2017)
 Harmony kernel 2.0 - Used for devices TEE (2018)

HarmonyOS 1.0 

HarmonyOS 1.0 [1.0.0 - OpenHarmony 1.0.0] (API version 5)

The first release of HarmonyOS was on August 9, 2019 for the Honor-branded smart TV series, followed by Huawei Vision S-branded smart TV series. The system was able to run native HarmonyOS apps built on HarmonyOS Ability Package (HAP) with a new app package .app for the TV ecosystem. It was also compatible with legacy Android apps running .apk files, with in-house development for key modules based on open-source framework and incorporated the following features:

 Huawei AppGallery, allowing application downloads and updates through the Market application.
 Huawei Browser 
 Camera support 
 Huawei ID, allowing management of over-the-air synchronization of Gmail, People, and Calendar.
 Petal Search, allowing users to search the Internet and phone applications, contacts, calendar, etc.
 Huawei MeeTime video messaging.
 EMUI Huawei smartphone and tablet devices connectivity support
 Mirror Share support
 Huawei Music music streaming service, enabling management, importing, and playback of media files.
 Huawei Video
 Wallpaper support
 Compatible with Android apps running .apk files, with in-house development for key modules based on open-source framework.
 Native HarmonyOS apps built on HarmonyOS Ability Package (HAP) with a new app package .app for the TV ecosystem
 Other applications include: Photos and Settings.
 Wi-Fi and Bluetooth support.
 Distributed architecture
 Huawei ARK compiler
 Deterministic Latency Engine
 Formal verification of TEE microkernel and Multi-device IDE (Beta)
Version 1.2 obtained a Common Criteria certification for security.

HarmonyOS 2.0 
HarmonyOS 2.0 [2.0.0 - OpenHarmony 2.2.0] (API version 6)

HarmonyOS 2.0 was launched at the Huawei Developer Conference on 10 September 2020. Huawei announced it intended to ship the operating system on its smartphones in 2021. The first developer beta of HarmonyOS 2.0 was released on December 16, 2020 for the Chinese domestic market on older Huawei smartphone models which include developer features to build HAP apps and SDK tools for developers. Huawei also released the DevEco Studio IDE, which is based on IntelliJ IDEA, and a cloud emulator for developers in early access.

Released on June 2, 2021, HarmonyOS 2 includes in-house development for the kernel and app framework for the general public in the Chinese domestic market.

This version includes a new Harmony OS 2.0 home screen based on EMUI design, new control panel design layout with Super Device, Service Center, Service Cards, and App Snippets for the atomic services platform exclusive to native HarmonyOS apps. It has shared multitasking known as Task Center for Huawei devices between phone and tablets as well as running more than one app on tablet and phone screens. The new OS is also optimized for Huawei Super Device, connecting Huawei computers, tablets and smartphones with on-screen gestures and multi-screen collaboration.

 Smartphone and tablet home screen based on EMUI design.
 Android compatibility apps of Android 10 and 11 support with .apk and .aab packages support with Linux on phones and tablets
 A new control panel design layout with Super Device.
 Service Center, Service Cards, and App Snippets for the atomic services platform exclusive to native HarmonyOS apps.
 Shared app multitasking known as Task Center across Huawei devices between phone and tablets as well as running more than one app on tablet. The Task Center allows phone screens using the base CPU for apps or the GPU of the host distributed device for games. Including drag and drop of documents from one device to another in an app.
 Optimized for Huawei Super Device, connecting Huawei computers, tablets and smartphones with on-screen gestures and multi-screen collaboration.
 EROFS read only file system support
 (HDFS) HarmonyOS Distributed File System file system
 Comprehensive security kernel stack

HarmonyOS 3.0 
HarmonyOS 3.0 [3.0.0.76 - OpenHarmony 3.0] (API version 8)

HarmonyOS 3 was announced on Huawei Developers Conference 2021 on October 22, 2021 and launched on July 27, 2022.

The Harmony OS 3 version was reported to bring more stability and increased performance of the system's kernel for better user experience and low power consumption. The new release also aims to bring more power to the Super Device feature, which allows connectivity between smart devices with a single super device such as a smartphone. It includes Huawei services such as Huawei Mobile Services (HMS) for Harmony Ability Packages (HAP) native HarmonyOS apps, Celia Assistant and Service Center in global markets.

Java language support dropped on HMOS 3.0 for main full support of eTS, JS and future Cangjie programming languages in the new version of the operating system. Since API Level 8, .hap apps can run on both HarmonyOS and OpenHarmony.

Huawei aims to release the new version of the operating system globally to older models gradually and release new smartphone and tablet models in two months after the release.

 Improved organised folders with Service Cards support and enhanced Service cards customisations resizing.
 A new Super Home Screen which is an extension of the super device features introduced on HMOS 2 that allows users to share the mobile home screen application to their devices powered by HarmonyOS operating system. Similar to shared multitasking of apps on HarmonyOS 2 on HarmonyOS powered devices.
 Improvements with UI/UX experiences.
 Optimised and performance latency improvements bringing more fluid experience to the operating system.
 Super Device enhancements.
 Celia Assistant and Service Center in global markets.
 Android compatibility version upgrade to Android 12 for the compatibility of latest Android apps on smartphones and tablets.
 Status bar customisations on smartphones.
 Improvements to privacy protections
 New Super Device settings interface.
 Java language support dropped for main full support of eTS, JS and future Cangjie programming languages in the new version of the operating system.
 .hap apps can both run on both Huawei's HarmonyOS and open source HarmonyOS, OpenHarmony.
 Supports for more than one headphones, earphones connectivity via Bluetooth connectivity on Super Device.
 New UI embedded on the home screen of Themes customisation with colours, shape of icons etc.
 Service Cards now has additional customisation sizes.
 New organisation folders layout that allows system toggles customisation directly on the home screen without the need to drag down Control Panel center. 
 Service Cards can now be organised in folders with customisation sizes.
 Service Cards can now be organised as a collection of cards that allows users to flick different Atomic Service Cards.

See also 

 iOS version history
 Android version history
 Windows 10 version history
 LiteOS
 EulerOS

References

External links 
 
 OpenHarmony website

Software version histories
Huawei products